Blakehurst is a suburb in southern Sydney, in the state of New South Wales, Australia 18 kilometres south of the Sydney central business district, in the local government area of the Georges River Council. It is part of the St George area.

Blakehurst is connected to Sylvania, in the Sutherland Shire, to the south, by Tom Uglys Bridge over the Georges River. Tom Uglys Point is the southernmost part. The eastern border runs along Kogarah Bay and the western border runs along Kyle Bay.

History
Blakehurst was named after William Blake, road assessor and postmaster for Cooks River in 1863.

A punt was established in 1864 at Tom Uglys Point or Punt Point. A few tales have been told about the origin of the name possibly being mispronunciation by local Aborigines of the names of two locals, Tom Huxley or Tom Woguly. However, it is now believed that it was named after an Aboriginal man from the south coast called 'Towwaa' or Toweiry', who later lived and died at the point. His nickname was Tom Ugly.

Tom Uglys Bridge was originally known as Georges River Bridge when it first opened in 1929. The second crossing at this location was opened in 1987.

Heritage listings 
Blakehurst has a number of heritage-listed sites, including:
 9 Stuart Crescent: Thurlow House

Commercial area

A small shopping strip is located on the Princes Highway near the intersection with King Georges Road. Commercial developments also extend north along these two main roads. A bus service runs between Hurstville and Miranda via Blakehurst and Sylvania.

Tom Uglys Point features a couple of small reserves, fishing spots, a marina, seafood restaurants and a number of take-away seafood shops.

Schools
There are both public and catholic schools in Blakehurst.  Mater Dei Primary School is a Catholic-run primary school. Blakehurst High School, Blakehust Public School and Bald Face Public School are public schools.

Sport and recreation
Blakehurst has many sporting teams including the rugby union team, The Blakehurst Blues. Past famous players and locals include ex-Wallaby star Phil Kearns and current Waikato forward Toby Lind.  Kogarah Bay Sailing Club and marina is located on Princes Highway.

Population

According to the 2016 census, there were 6,219 people usually resident in Blakehurst. 64.4% of people were born in Australia. The next most common countries of birth were China 8.2%, Greece 2.5%, Hong Kong 2.2% and Lebanon 1.9%. 51.6% of people only spoke English at home. Other languages spoken at home included Greek 12.4%, Mandarin 7.7%, Cantonese 7.7%, Arabic 4.9% and Macedonian 1.9%. The most common responses for religious affiliation were Catholic 22.5%, Eastern Orthodox 21.1%, No Religion 19.3% and Anglican 10.3%.

References

External links
  [CC-By-SA]

Suburbs of Sydney
Georges River Council